Minden is a rural community in the Western Bay of Plenty District and Bay of Plenty Region of New Zealand's North Island. The peak that the area is named after was named after the 1759 Battle of Minden in Prussia by a soldier stationed in Tauranga in 1866 after the Tauranga campaign.

The Minden lookout on the corner of Minden and Junction roads provides views over Tauranga.

The Minden Scenic Reserve has a 15-minute loop walk from Ainsworth Road.

Minden Peak is at 288 metres above sea level, and can be accessed via the Minden Stairs, with over 320 steps.

Demographics

Minden had a population of 2,133 at the 2018 New Zealand census, an increase of 402 people (23.2%) since the 2013 census, and an increase of 525 people (32.6%) since the 2006 census. There were 717 households, comprising 1,056 males and 1,077 females, giving a sex ratio of 0.98 males per female. The median age was 44.3 years (compared with 37.4 years nationally), with 450 people (21.1%) aged under 15 years, 312 (14.6%) aged 15 to 29, 1,047 (49.1%) aged 30 to 64, and 324 (15.2%) aged 65 or older.

Ethnicities were 92.4% European/Pākehā, 12.5% Māori, 1.7% Pacific peoples, 2.8% Asian, and 1.5% other ethnicities. People may identify with more than one ethnicity.

The percentage of people born overseas was 21.0, compared with 27.1% nationally.

Although some people chose not to answer the census's question about religious affiliation, 51.3% had no religion, 37.4% were Christian, 1.0% had Māori religious beliefs, 0.4% were Hindu, 0.6% were Buddhist and 0.6% had other religions.

Of those at least 15 years old, 396 (23.5%) people had a bachelor's or higher degree, and 207 (12.3%) people had no formal qualifications. The median income was $38,800, compared with $31,800 nationally. 357 people (21.2%) earned over $70,000 compared to 17.2% nationally. The employment status of those at least 15 was that 825 (49.0%) people were employed full-time, 360 (21.4%) were part-time, and 39 (2.3%) were unemployed.

References

Western Bay of Plenty District
Populated places in the Bay of Plenty Region